Sonnat may refer to:
 Sonnat-e Olya
 Sonnat-e Sofla